Edward Davidson may refer to: 

 Edward S. Davidson, professor of electrical engineering and computer science
 Eddie Davidson (1973–2008), American e-mail marketer

See also
 Edward Davison (disambiguation)